Ted Steinberg (born 1961 in Brooklyn, New York) is a Professor of History and Professor of Law at Case Western Reserve University.

Background 
He was born in Brooklyn and raised in Merrick, Long Island, New York. He had a pro-Israel upbringing and had a bar mitzvah at Temple Beth Am in Merrick in April 1974. As an undergraduate he become an anti-Zionist after reading works by Noam Chomsky and Edward Said. He received his BA summa cum laude in 1983 from Tufts University. He received a Ph.D. in history from Brandeis University in 1989, where he worked under the guidance of Donald Worster, David Hackett Fischer, and Morton Horwitz. From 1990 to 1993 he was a visiting assistant professor at the University of Michigan, and 1993 to 1996 he was an assistant professor at the New Jersey Institute of Technology. He was hired at Case Western Reserve University in 1996. Since 2006 he has been the Adeline Barry Davee Distinguished Professor of History. He also serves as faculty adviser for the Radical Student Union and faculty adviser for Students for Justice in Palestine at Case Western Reserve University.

Scholarship 
Steinberg is the author of several books in U.S. history that focus on the relationship between ecological forces and social power. His best known works include Down to Earth: Nature’s Role in American History (2002); Acts of God: The Unnatural History of Natural Disaster in America (2000); and American Green: The Obsessive Quest for the Perfect Lawn (2006). His most recent book, Gotham Unbound: The Ecological History of Greater New York (2014), reinterprets the New York metropolitan area’s history from an environmental perspective and argues against the commonly held view that geography determined the city’s destiny. Considered by some to be an ecosocialist or pro-socialist scholar, Steinberg is highly critical of the impact that capitalism has had on the environment and society.

His books have received the following prizes: National Outdoor Book Award in the category of Nature & the Environment for Down to Earth: Nature’s Role in American History, 2002; Ohio Academy of History's Publication Award for Acts of God: The Unnatural History of Natural Disaster in America, 2001; co-winner, the Law and Society Association's J. Willard Hurst Prize for the best work in socio-legal history for Nature Incorporated: Industrialization and the Waters of New England, 1992; and the Old Sturbridge Village E. Harold Hugo Memorial Book Prize for the best book on the history and material culture of rural New England for Nature Incorporated, 1992.

He has been the recipient of support from the Michigan Society of Fellows (1990–1993), the John Simon Guggenheim Memorial Foundation (1996), the American Council of Learned Societies Burkhardt Fellowship (2001), the National Endowment for the Humanities (2010), and Yale University, where he was the B. Benjamin Zucker Fellow in 2006.

Activism 
Inspired by Noam Chomsky and Edward Said, he advocates for the rights of the Palestinian people living under Israeli occupation and supports the Boycott, Divestment and Sanctions movement,
 including the boycott of Israeli academic institutions. As faculty adviser for Students for Justice in Palestine, he supported a student government resolution at Case Western Reserve University calling for the university to divest from corporations that do business in Israel.

Steinberg has written editorials expressing criticism of the market economy and capitalism.

He written for CounterPunch, Dissent, The Chronicle of Higher Education, Discover, Scientific American, Natural History, and The New York Times among others. He has appeared on numerous radio and television shows including Freakonomics Radio, Radio Times with Marty Moss-Coane, The Leonard Lopate Show, The Dennis Prager Show, The Michael Smerconish Show, Marketplace, The Jerry Doyle Show, The Mischke Broadcast, Martha Stewart Living Radio, To the Best of Our Knowledge, and Penn & Teller: Bullshit.

Publications
Nature Incorporated: Industrialization and the Waters of New England (1991). 
Slide Mountain, or the Folly of Owning Nature (1995). 
Acts of God: The Unnatural History of Natural Disaster (2000). 
Down to Earth: Nature’s Role in American History (2002). , (4th edition, 2018) 
American Green: The Obsessive Quest for the Perfect Lawn (2006). 
Gotham Unbound: The Ecological History of Greater New York (2014).

References

External links
Personal Website
Case Western Reserve University Department of History Faculty Page

21st-century American historians
21st-century American male writers
Environmental historians
1961 births
Living people
Case Western Reserve University faculty
Tufts University alumni
Brandeis University alumni
American male non-fiction writers